Pino III Ordelaffi (11 March 1436 – 10 February 1480) was an Italian condottiero and lord of Forlì. He was a member of the Ordelaffi family.

The son of Antonio I Ordelaffi, he was the brother of Francesco IV Ordelaffi, lord of Forlì from 1448. In 1462 he married Barbara Manfredi, daughter of Astorre II, lord of Faenza.

In 1463 Pino fell ill: Francesco was suspected of having poisoned him, but he recovered. In 1466, as Francesco lay ill in turn, Pino's seized the city and assumed the lordship of Forlì and Forlimpopoli. Soon after Barbara died, and Astorre Manfredi suspected Pino of poisoning her out of jealousy. Therefore, Pino sought an alliance with Taddeo Manfredi, lord of Imola and rival of Astorre, to counter the latter's attempt to oust him with the help of the Pope. Pino married Taddeo's daughter Zaffira, but in 1473 he also had her poisoned. Pino also had his mother poisoned in 1467. He then married Lucrezia Pico della Mirandola, sister of Giovanni Pico della Mirandola, who a contemporary noted was "always very careful with what she ate".

In 1467 he also took part in the Battle of Molinella, where he was wounded.

Pino was a patron of the arts, building numerous edifices in Forlì; he also completed the construction of the walls and strengthened the Castle. A monument commissioned by Pino to Francesco di Simone Ferrucci for his wife Barbara's tomb can be seen in the Abbey of San Mercuriale in Forlì.

He died in 1480, being briefly succeeded by his son Sinibaldo before the acquisition of the Forlivese lands by Girolamo Riario.

References

Footnotes

Ordelaffi, Pino 3
Ordelaffi, Pino 3
15th-century murderers
Pino 3
Ordelaffi, Pino 3
Ordelaffi, Pino 3
Poisoners
Lords of Forlì
Medieval assassins